Lemany may refer to the following places:
Lemany, Masovian Voivodeship (east-central Poland)
Lemany, Pomeranian Voivodeship (north Poland)
Lemany, Warmian-Masurian Voivodeship (north Poland)